Stefanos Vavoulas (born 4 January 1965) is a retired Greek football defender.

References

1965 births
Living people
Greek footballers
OFI Crete F.C. players
Super League Greece players
Association football defenders